Oleksandr Andriyovych Byelyayev (born 4 October 1999) is a Ukrainian professional footballer who plays as a midfielder for Lviv on loan from Gençlerbirliği.

Career
Byelyayev is a product of the FC Dnipro Youth system. In March 2017, he was promoted to the first team squad of FC Dnipro but never made an appearance.

In June 2017, he joined the newly-created SC Dnipro-1 and made his debut against FC Metalist 1925 Kharkiv on 15 July in the Ukrainian Second League.

References

External links

1999 births
Living people
Footballers from Dnipro
Ukrainian footballers
Ukrainian expatriate footballers
FC Dnipro players
FC Zirka Kropyvnytskyi players
SC Dnipro-1 players
FC Saburtalo Tbilisi players
FC VPK-Ahro Shevchenkivka players
Gençlerbirliği S.K. footballers
Ukrainian Premier League players
Ukrainian First League players
Ukrainian Second League players
Erovnuli Liga players
TFF First League players
Expatriate footballers in Georgia (country)
Ukrainian expatriate sportspeople in Georgia (country)
Expatriate footballers in Turkey
Ukrainian expatriate sportspeople in Turkey

Association football midfielders
Ukraine youth international footballers